Frankenchrist is the third album by the American hardcore punk band Dead Kennedys, released in 1985 on Alternative Tentacles.

The album is an example of the progressive, psychedelic side of Dead Kennedys' musical personality. The spaghetti Western soundtrack influence is noticeable in the horn parts and in East Bay Ray's guitar work. Frankenchrist is also noted for its relative lack of traditionally "hardcore" material, with most of the tracks being slower and longer than the majority of other Dead Kennedys songs. "M.T.V. − Get off the Air" is notable for its pointed slam of the music establishment and "Stars and Stripes of Corruption" for its exegesis of vocalist Jello Biafra's political philosophies.

Controversies

"Landscape #XX"
The album was a subject of controversy because the original record sleeve included a poster featuring the painting Landscape #XX, or Penis Landscape, by H. R. Giger, depicting rows of copulating penises and vulvae. The choice of the painting came as the result of a comment by Jello Biafra to his then-roommate and Dead Kennedys artist, Jayed Scotti, art partners with Winston Smith. Biafra showed Scotti a copy of Omni magazine showing several works of art by Giger, including "Penis Landscape", printed in 1977, for a Paris art collection. Biafra said he wanted to use the piece on the upcoming album cover. Scotti phoned New York agent Les Barany and explained the project. Barany contacted Giger to ask permission, then contacted Mike Bonanno of Alternative Tentacles Records; Giger agreed to let the label use a reproduction chrome of the artwork for $600, half the usual price. Biafra presented the idea to the other members of the band, but the idea was rejected as the album cover and as an interior gatefold double LP album. Finally it was accepted as an inserted poster. Jayed Scotti created the production mechanicals by hand for the poster. The poster was printed and inserted in the Frankenchrist album with an additional sticker on the outside shrinkwrap, warning buyers of the contents.

Biafra was brought to trial for distributing harmful matter to minors, and though the case did not result in a conviction, Alternative Tentacles was almost driven to bankruptcy.  It was only through the support of fans that the label was able to stay alive. Biafra gained attention as a champion of free speech, and was subsequently one of the most active opponents of the Parents Music Resource Center.

Shriners 
Frankenchrist'''s front cover itself depicts a Shriners parade, featuring Shriners members driving miniature cars, wearing their distinctive red fez hats. The four Shriners members pictured in the photograph sued Dead Kennedys in 1986. The image was originally photographed and published by Newsweek in the 1970s, a decade before the Frankenchrist usage by Dead Kennedys and Alternative Tentacles in 1985.

Critical receptionTrouser Press'' wrote: "There are some bad tracks with forced, awkward lyrics, but the LP does contain two of the DKs’ finest moments: 'MTV — Get Off the Air' and 'Stars and Stripes of Corruption', one of the most powerful political statements ever committed to vinyl."

Track listing

Personnel
Dead Kennedys
 Jello Biafra – lead vocals, producer, mixer
 East Bay Ray – guitar, synthesizer on "At My Job", 12 string electric bellzouki brand acoustic guitar on "MTV - Get off the Air"
 Klaus Flouride – bass, backing vocals 
 D.H. Peligro – drums, backing vocals
Additional Performers
 John Leib – trumpet on "MTV - Get Off The Air"
 Tim Jones – keyboards on "A Growing Boy Needs His Lunch"
 Nina T.R. Stapleton – backing vocals on "Jock-O-Rama"
 Laura T.R. Muetz – backing vocals on "Jock-O-Rama"
 Julie Hoffman – backing vocals on "Jock-O-Rama" 
 Susan Caldwell – backing vocals on "Jock-O-Rama"
 Danielle Dunlap – backing vocals on "Jock-O-Rama"
 Robyn Lutz – backing vocals on "Jock-O-Rama"
 Kris Carleson – backing vocals on "Jock-O-Rama"
 Steve DePace – backing vocals on "At My Job"
 Wild Bill – backing vocals on "At My Job" 
 Sweet – backing vocals on "At My Job"
 Wee Willy Lipat – backing vocals on "At My Job"
 Microwave – backing vocals on "At My Job"
 Gary Floyd – backing vocals on "Chicken Farm" and "Stars and Stripes of Corruption"
 Eugene Robinson – backing vocals on "Chicken Farm" and "Stars and Stripes of Corruption"
 Jeff Davis – backing vocals on "Chicken Farm" and "Stars and Stripes of Corruption"
Production
 John Cuniberti – engineer, mixer
 Winston Smith – artwork

Charts

Certifications

References

1985 albums
Alternative Tentacles albums
Dead Kennedys albums
Censorship of music
Obscenity controversies in music
Albums with cover art by H. R. Giger